The Opole Medical School (Polish name: PMWSZ - Państwowa Medyczna Wyższa Szkoła Zawodowa) is a state-owned medical school in Opole. The school was established on 1 May 2003.
PMWSZ teaches in the following areas:
 obstetrics
 nursing
 physiotherapy
 public health
 cosmetology

and, with the consent of the Ministry of Science and Higher Education of the Republic of Poland:

 medical emergency

Rector: Tomasz Halski, MD, PhD

External links 
 Official website of Opole Medical School;

Opole
Universities and colleges in Opole
Universities and colleges in Poland